This is a list of band members from Japanese rock music ensemble Acid Mothers Temple and related musical groups.

Acid Mothers Temple and the Melting Paraiso U.F.O.

The most prolific and widely known of the various Acid Mothers Temple collectives, Acid Mothers Temple & the Melting Paraiso U.F.O. is a 5-piece that plays mostly psychedelic, space-rock type music. Their pieces are often improvised, free-form or experimental, while incorporating elements of American psych rock, drone and world music. 
Current touring members (April 2018) of Acid Mothers Temple & the Melting Paraiso U.F.O. '''
 Kawabata Makoto – guitars, vocals, "speed guru" (1995–present)
 Higashi Hiroshi – synthesizer, keyboards, guitars, vocals, "noodle god" (1998–present)
 Jyonson Tsu – vocal, guitar, bouzouki, electronics, "midnight whistler" (2017, 2018–present)
 Satoshima Nani – drums, "another dimension" (2014–present)

Previous members
 Cotton Casino – synthesizer, vocals (1995–2004, 2013)
 Koizumi Hajime – drums (1995–2001, 2002, 2003–2005)
 Suhara Keizo – bass guitar (1995–1998)
 Yasuda Hisashi – bass guitar (1998)
 Ichiraku Yoshimitsu – drums (2001–2002, 2009)
 Audrey Gineset – vocals, bass guitar, piano (2001)
 Magic Aum Gigi – harp (2002)
 Uki Eiji – drums (2002, 2005–2006)
 Okano Futoshi – drums (2002–2003)
 Ono Ryoko – saxophone, flute (2005–2006, 2007)
 Nao – vocals (2005–2006)
 Kitagawa Hao – theremin, vocals (2006–2007)
 Shimura Koji – drums (2006–2014)
 Tsuyama Atsushi – bass guitar, vocals (1998–2015)
 Tabata Mitsuru – guitars, vocals, "hugs & kisses" (2012–2017)
 Wolf (a.k.a. S/T), – bass guitar, "space & time" (2016–2021)

Kawabata Makoto and the Mothers of Invasion

sometimes playing under the name "What?"
Current members
 Kawabata Makoto – guitar (2001–present)
 Tabata Mitsuru  – bass guitar (2002–present)
 Mori Kimiho – drums (2002–present)
 Higashi Hiroshi – synthesisers (2002–present)

Former members
 Tsuyama Atsushi – bass guitar (2001–2002)
 Ichiraku Yoshimitsu – drums (2001–2002)

Acid Mothers Temple SWR

(previously known as Acid Mothers Temple mode HHH and Seikazoku)
SWR is an experimental, free-jazz trio composed of Tsuyama, Kawabata, and Japanese experimental rock guru Yoshida Tatsuya of Ruins.
Current members
 Kawabata Makoto – guitar, bouzouki, electronics (2003–present)
 Tsuyama Atsushi – bass guitar, vocals (2003–present)
 Yoshida Tatsuya – drums, percussion, vocals (2003–present)

Acid Mothers Gong

Former members
Kawabata Makoto – guitar (2003–2006)
Daevid Allen – vocals, guitar (2003–2006)
Josh Pollock – guitar, megaphone (2003–2006)
Cotton Casino – synth, voices (2003–2006)
Gilli Smyth – vocals (2003–2006)
Higashi Hiroshi – synthesizer (2003–2006)
Yoshida Tatsuya – drums, vocals (2003–2006)
Tsuyami Atsushi – bass guitar, vocals (2003–2006)

Acid Mothers Afrirampo

Acid Mothers Afrirampo is essentially the core three members of Acid Mothers Temple plus the two members of Afrirampo. Acid Mothers Afrirampo's music is closer to free jazz with experimental elements. There is also a strong focus on the drums.
Current members
 Kawabata Makoto – electric guitar, violin, hurdygurdy, glockenspiel, percussion, electronics, vocals (2004–present)
 Tsuyama Atsushi – vocals, bass guitar, drums, digital guitar, acoustic guitar, soprano recorder, kantele (2004–present)
 Higashi Hiroshi – electronics (2004–present)
 Oni – vocals, electric guitar, digital guitar, soprano recorder, drums (2004–present)
 Pika – vocals, drums, percussion, noise (2004–present)

Acid Mothers Temple and the Cosmic Inferno

Acid Mothers Temple & the Cosmic Inferno differs from the Melting Paraiso U.F.O. not only in line-up but also in style of music. The Cosmic Inferno generally plays much heavier, hard-rock inspired psychedelia, and experiments more with effects pedals.
Current members
 Kawabata Makoto – guitar, bouzouki, electronics (2005–present)
 Higashi Hiroshi – synthesizer, guitar (2005–present)
 Tabata Mitsuru – bass guitar, vocals (2005–present)
 Shimura Koji – drums, percussion (2005–present)

Former members
 Okano Futoshi – drums (2005–2008)
 Pikachu – drums, vocals (2008)
 Audrey Ginestet – vocals (2008)

Acid Mothers Temple and the Pink Ladies Blues

The Pink Ladies Blues is another Acid Mothers Temple side-project, notable largely because it does not include Kawabata Makoto. In fact, that trio is led by Magic Aum Gigi, who was a member of Acid Mothers Temple in 2002. Their music is traditional blues and psychedelic.
Current members
 Magic Aum Gigi – electric guitar (2005–present)
 Tsuchy – electric guitar (2005–present)
 Mai Mai – drums (2005–present)

Acid Mothers Temple and the Incredible Strange Band

Current members
Kawabata Makoto – electric sitar, violin, hurdy-gurdy (2006–present)
Tsuyama Atsushi – guitar, vocals (2006–present)
Tsuyama Akiko – vocals (2006–present)
Suhara Keizo – bass guitar (2006–present)
Aiko – drums (2006–present)

Acid Mothers Guru Guru

(previously known as Acid Gurus Temple)
Acid Mothers Guru Guru was founded on a concept similar to SWR, but instead features the drumming of Krautrock drummer Mani Neumeier of Guru Guru.
Current members
 Kawabata Makoto – guitar, bouzouki, electronics (2006–present)
 Tsuyama Atsushi – bass guitar, vocals (2006–present)
 Mani Neumeier – drums, vocals (2006–present)

MMMH!

Kawabata Makoto – guitar (2009–present)
Julien Barbagallo – drums, vocals (2009–present)
Julien Gasc – guitars, keyboards, vocals (2009–present)
Benjamin Glibert – guitars, vocals (2009–present)
Audrey Ginestet – bass, vocals (2009–present)
Manon Glibert – clarinet (2009–present)
Latifa Forestier – trumpet, theremin, backing vocals (2009–present)
Francois Gout – organ, backing vocals (2009–present)
Fanny Harney – drums (2009–present)
Alexandre Piques – drums (2009–present)
Olve Strelow – drums (2009–present)

to release debut LP/CD on Manimal Vinyl in October 2009

Acid Mothers Temple and Space Paranoid 

Acid Mothers Temple & Space Paranoid is the more hard rock leaning, heavily Black Sabbath influenced iteration of Acid Mothers Temple.
Current members
Tabata Mitsuru – bass, voice, maratab (2013–present)
Higashi Hiroshi – synthesizer (2013–present)
Okano Futoshi – drums (2013–present)
Kawabata Makoto – guitars (2013–present)

References 

Acid Mothers Temple